FC Kufstein is an Austrian football club located in Kufstein, a town in the state of Tyrol in the west of the country. They currently play in the Regionalliga Tirol, the third tier of Austrian football.

History 

The club was formed in 1919, around twenty years after football was popularised in Austria. The club was known as SV Kufstein up until World War II, and from 1946 to 1987 as SC Kufstein. The current name was adopted in 1987 following a merger with local amateur club ESV Kufstein. Since 1987, the club has played in the Austrian Regional League West and the Austrian Football First League.

Stadium 

FC Kufstein play their home matches in Kufstein Arena, which is close to the centre of the town. The stadium was opened in 1925 and substantially redeveloped in 1999. The current capacity is 4500. The team's average home attendance for the 2010–11 season was 265. The stadium has hosted international matches, including 2010 friendlies between Belarus and South Korea and Poland and Serbia.

Current squad

Achievements 

 Austrian Third Division (West):
 Winners (4): 1983, 1986, 1993, 2005
 Tyrol State League:
 Winners (3): 1949, 1973, 1981

See also 

 Football in Austria
 Austrian Regional League West

References

External links 
  – Official website
  – Facebook page
  – YouTube channel

Football clubs in Austria
Association football clubs established in 1919
FC Kufstein
Kufstein